Rodney Frederick Banting was a British racecar driver who won the 1964 BRSCC British Formula 3 Championship.

Career
Banting started out racing in British Formula Junior, driving a privately entered Lotus 20. He advertised the Lotus 20 for sale in Autosport Magazine in March 1962 as he progressed into the Lotus 22 and later a Lotus 31. For 1963, he entered a Brabham BT6 and secured his best result at the 1963 British Formula Junior race at Mallory Park with 3rd place.

In 1964 he moved into British Formula 3, and won the BRSCC British F3 Championship.  By 1965, Banting had joined Stockbridge Racing and began competing in Europe driving in Formula 3 and Formula 2.  He secured two podium finishes with a race win at the Grande Prémio de Portugal in July, driving a Cooper T76 and 3rd in the Grand Prix de la Chatre driving a Lotus 22. The T76 he used to win the race was auctioned at the Bonhams Goodwood Revival auction in 2018.

His final competitive championship race came in Swedish Formula 3 for Stockbridge, where he was a guest driver at Gelleråsen.  He finished the race in 3rd place.

In 1972, Banting started the Banting Earle Racing Team alongside Mike Earle. The team fielded Pygmee Ford's in the 1972 European Formula Two Championship with drivers Patrick dal Bo, Derek Bell and Carlos Pace.

External links
 Rodney Banting at driverDB
 Rodney Banting at Racing Years
 Rodney Banting at Motorsport Magazine

References

1944 births
1996 deaths
British racing drivers
British Formula Three Championship drivers